MS Moby Tommy is a fast passenger roll-on/roll-off (Ro-Ro) cruiseferry, currently owned by the Italy-based shipping company Moby Lines and operated on their Piombino and Livorno–Olbia route. She was built in 2002 by Samsung Heavy Industries Co. Ltd., Geoje, South Korea for the Greek company, Minoan Lines as MS Ariadne Palace.

Sister ships
MS Oceaneus
MS Prometheus

References

External links

 M/S Ariadne Palace specifications

2001 ships
Ships built by Samsung Heavy Industries
Transport in Sardinia